Ratabari Assembly constituency (Bengali: রাতাবাড়ী বিধানসভা সমষ্টি) is one of the 126 state legislative assembly constituencies in Assam state in North Eastern India. It is also one of the 8 state legislative assembly constituencies included in the Karimganj Lok Sabha constituency. This constituency is reserved for the Scheduled caste candidates.

Members of Legislative Assembly

Election results

2021 results

2019 result

2016 result

2011 result

See also
 List of constituencies of Assam Legislative Assembly
 Ramkrishna Nagar

References

External links 
 

Karimganj district
Assembly constituencies of Assam